Nupserha brevior is a species of beetle in the family Cerambycidae. It was described by Maurice Pic in 1908.

References

brevior
Beetles described in 1908